This is a list of glass factories that operated in Blackford County, Indiana, United States. Natural gas (and later crude oil) was discovered in Blackford County in 1887.  This discovery marked the start of Blackford County's participation in the Indiana Gas Boom.  Manufacturers, especially glass makers, were lured to the area with promises of free gas, free land, and (in some cases) cash subsidies.  Hartford City Glass Company, Sneath Glass Company, and Johnston Glass Company were the largest glass companies during the gas boom.  The current Hartford Glass Company is the longest lived.  During the 1890s, the Hartford City Glass Company was the third-largest window glass producer in the United States, and Sneath Glass Company was the country's largest producer of lantern globes.

During the early 1900s, gas supplies gradually became depleted—and the East Central Indiana Gas Boom gradually came to an end.  Many factories closed or moved.  In the case of Hartford City's glass factories, the larger and better-managed factories (such as the large American Window Glass plant, Sneath Glass, and Johnston Glass) continued to operate, while the smaller glass works closed or were absorbed by other companies.

Glass capital
For a brief period, residents of Hartford City (the county seat of Blackford County) thought their city would become the window glass capital of the world.  The city was already the home of one of the largest window glass plants in the nation, a bottle-making plant, and multiple glassware producers.  During the spring of 1900, rumors circulated that the American Window Glass trust, which had acquired over 40 glass works in 1899, planned to move production from some of its smaller plants to its large Hartford City plant.  If the Hartford City plant would have its capacity expanded equal to the capacity of the plants to be consolidated, then Hartford City would have "become the greatest window glass town in the world."  The plant would have employed nearly 1000 people, and equal the largest window glass plant in the world in capacity.  That plant in combination with Hartford City's other window glass factories, and not even considering the flint glass plants or bottle plants, would make the city's window glass capacity the highest in the world.  However, the large Hartford City plant was not expanded, and continued to have a capacity of 104 pots—keeping it the third largest window glass plant in the United States, and largest west of Pennsylvania.

Dunkirk
A small portion of Dunkirk, Indiana, is located in Blackford County—and Dunkirk was the location of numerous glass factories.  The Dunkirk factories were not located within Blackford County, so they are not listed in the table below.  Seven Dunkirk glass factories, employing a total of 1,108 people, were inspected by the state in 1898.  Those factories were:  Bates Window Glass Company, Beatty-Brady Glass Company, Dunkirk Window Glass Company, Enterprise Window Glass Company, Gem Window Glass Works, Maring, Hart and Company, and Ohio Flint Glass Company.

Glass men

Local capitalist Henry B. "H.B." Smith (1847–1909) was president of Hartford City's Citizen's Bank.  His participation in the glass industry was as a financial stakeholder and officer of the Hartford City Glass Company, and later as a director of the American Window Glass Company.  Smith was also involved with two business blocks and railroading.  Glassmaker Richard Heagany (1835–1925) was the founder of Hartford City Glass Company, and had over 25 years of glass-making experience.  Before moving to Hartford City, he had been superintendent of the largest window glass factory in New York, and founded a window glass works in Kokomo, Indiana.  Henry Crimmel (1844–1917) provided the glassmaking expertise for Hartford City's Sneath Glass Company.  Crimmel had about "half a century" of glassmaking experience, and helped start the Sneath Glass Company and several glass companies in Ohio.  John Rodgers Johnston (1867–1920) was one of Hartford City's glassmakers and financiers.  Johnson was an officer and plant manager of Hartford City Glass, founder of Johnston Glass Company in Hartford City, and founder of the Johnston Brokerage in Pittsburgh.  He was also involved with companies as diverse as the Berghoff Brewing Company, Newsome Feed and Grain Company, and Potomac Valley Orchard Company. George Fulton (1872–1930), former secretary-treasurer and plant manager at Johnston Glass, founded Hartford City's Fulton Glass Company in 1929.  Heagany, Crimmel, Johnston, and Fulton all had decades of glassmaking experience and provided on–site management for Hartford City's glass factories.

Glass factories

Blackford County's glass factories are listed below in the sortable list.  The first five categories in the list can be sorted. The list's default sort orders the properties alphabetically by name.  Notes are listed in the last section.  The figures for employees (where available) are the largest number from inspections by the state of Indiana in 1898, 1901, 1903, and 1910.

Notes

References

Blackford County, Indiana